Mansa is a town with municipality and former princely state, in Gandhinagar district in the western Indian state of Gujarat.

History 

During the British raj, Mansa was a Third class non-salute state under the Mahi Kantha Agency. It ceased to exist after the Indian independence by accession on 10 June 1948.

Ruling Raols

Geography 
Mansa is located at 23.43°N 72.67°E. It has an average elevation of 94 metres (308 feet).

Demographics 
 India census,  Mansa had a population of 27,922. Males constitute 52% of the population and females 48%. Mansa has an average literacy rate of 69%, higher than the national average of 59.5%: male literacy is 75%, and female literacy is 63%. In Mansa, 12% of the population is under 6 years of age.Mansa is also the home town of famous politician and home minister of India Amit Shah

Places of interest
There is an ancient stepwell in the town. It is 5.40 in diameter. There are idols of Amba and Bhairava in niches. There is an inscription of 28 lines in the stepwell.

There are old Vaishnava temples, Havelis, dedicated to Govardhannath and Dwarkadhish.

Mansa Panjarapol is over 140 years old charitable organisation dedicated to animal welfare.

References

External links and Sources 
 India Princely States on www.uq.net.au as archived on web.archive.org, with genealogy
 WorldStatesmen - India - Princely States K-Z

Cities and towns in Gandhinagar district